Greta Svabo Bech (born in Tórshavn) is a Faroese singer-songwriter. She first became known for her work with Canadian producer Deadmau5, when "Raise Your Weapon" was nominated for Best Dance Record at the 2011 Grammy Awards and hit the 100 spot on the Billboard Hot 100. Bech went on to work with Italian artists The Bloody Beetroots on their second album, Hide, and with Ludovico Einaudi on the remix version of his album In a Time Lapse. She started releasing solo material in 2013.

Discography

EPs
 Shut Up & Sing Reloaded (2013)
 Bones (2019)

Singles
 "Shut Up & Sing" (2013)
 "Broken Bones" (2013)
 "Brave Moon" (2013)
 "All My Bones" (2019)
 "Before You Go" (2019)
 "Breathe" (2021)
 "Dominoes" (2021)
 "Poison" (2021)

As featured artist
 "Smells Like Teen Spirit" - 6ix Toys (2011)
 "Another Day" - 6ix Toys (2011)
 "Black or White" - 6ix Toys (2011)
 "Fire Inside" - Gemini (2012)
 "Invisible" - The Bloody Beetroots (2017)
 "The Great Run" - The Bloody Beetroots (2017)
 "tu: Orbit" - Tom Ashbrook (2022)

Other appearances

Awards and nominations

References

External links
 

Living people
Faroese women singers
Faroese singer-songwriters
Popular music composers
1987 births
People from Tórshavn
21st-century Danish  women singers